Miriam Gonczarska (born 24 November 1972) is a Jewish spiritual leader who in 2015 received her Semikhah as the first European, and in the same time the first Polish, maharat.

Early life and education
Gonczarska was born in Warsaw, Poland to the Polish-Jewish family. She is a daughter of Edmund Gonczarski (Mendel Garncarski; 1922–1979), poet and journalist.

In 1994 she graduated of LXI Secondary School in Warsaw. From the beginning of 1990s she has been involved in revival of the Jewish community in Poland: she co-created "Jidele" (magazine for Jewish children), cooperated with "Midrasz" (Jewish cultural monthly magazine), and served as coordinator of educational programs at the Union of Jewish Religious Communities. She also worked as editor of "Kol Polin" – Hebrew language section of Radio Poland ( Polish Radio section for abroad). Her texts has been published also in press like "Więź" (Catholic monthly), "Gazeta Wyborcza", and "Przegląd Powszechny". She has also served as Jewish law and religion expert for the polish television ("Babilon" program for TVN24, "Piąta strona nieba" in Religia.tv, and press ("Wprost" weekly). She worked also worked with Jewish cultural and religious portal Jewish.org.pl.

She is a member, and also serves as Secretary, of the Religious Council of the Union of Jewish Religious Communities of Poland, member of the board of the polish Association of Jewish Women. She also is a member of B'nai B'rith Polska and Jewish Historical Institute Association. Until 2014 she has also served as member of the Revision Board of the Jewish Religious Community in Warsaw. She has also helped creating "Ec Chaim" – reform community by the Religious Jewish Community.

Miraim Gonczarska studied religious thought, and law and Torah in Israel (Nishmat, MaTan, and Pardes Institute of Jewish Studies) and in United States (Yeshiva Maharat). Gonczarska has a maharat (woman spiritual leader) degree received after graduation of 5-year study program of Yeshiva Maharat. She is the first European and Polish Jewish women to gain such degree and maharat title.

Inter-religious dialogue
Already as a student-member of PUSZ (Polish Union of Jewish Students), Gonczarska often participated in Christian-Jewish events like seminars or study tours organized by PUSZ together with KIK (Club of Catholic Intelligentsia). Her further involvement in Jewish community and studies of Jewish thought, went along her continuous commitment to dialogue between religions, especially with Christianity. She served as member of the board of the Polish Council of Christians and Jews.

See also
Yeshiva Maharat
Maharat

References

Living people
21st-century Polish rabbis
Polish Orthodox rabbis
Orthodox women rabbis
Modern Orthodox rabbis
Rabbis from Warsaw
1972 births